Unified Grocers, originally Unified Western Grocers, was a retailer-owned wholesale grocery cooperative that supplies independent supermarkets in the Western United States. It was formed in 1999 by the merger of two West Coast cooperatives, one based in Oregon and one in Los Angeles: United Grocers of Oregon (founded 1915) and Certified Grocers of California (founded 1922).  In 2007, it acquired Associated Grocers of Seattle, Washington, and shortened its name to Unified Grocers. The company has its headquarters in Commerce, California.

Unified Grocers was the largest retailer-owned wholesaler in the western United States.  They served more than 3,000 retail stores and recorded annual sales over $4 billion in 2009. There were over 500 co-op members and customers.

In April 2017, the company announced that it had entered into a merger agreement with SuperValu, in which SuperValu would acquire Unified Grocers, at a cost of around $375 million.  Unified is now a wholly owned subsidiary of SuperValu. The transaction was completed on June 23, 2017.

References

External links 

Economy of the Western United States
Supermarkets of the United States
American companies established in 1999
Retail companies established in 1999
American companies disestablished in 2017
Retail companies disestablished in 2017
Retailers' cooperatives in the United States